Cécile Hernandez-Cervellon (born 20 June 1974), who also competes as Cécile Hernandez, is a French para-snowboarder and four-time Paralympic medallist, with a gold medal from Beijing 2022, a silver medal from Sochi 2014 and both a silver and a bronze from PyeongChang 2018.

Life and career 
Hernandez-Cervellon began her sporting career as a BMX racer in international competition before discovering snowboarding. On 21 October 2002 she experienced an attack of multiple sclerosis that paralysed her legs for two months.

In May 2012, Hernandez-Cervellon arranged an endurance race for both disabled and able-bodied athletes, travelling from Lyon to Bordeaux by bicycle and kayak. Then, in 2013, when she happened to try snowboarding again in the French Alps, she was spotted by a member of the French para-snowboarding team. She was selected for the Paralympic snowboarding team for the Sochi Games in February 2014, with just over a month to prepare, but was encouraged by her performance at the World Para Snowboard World Cup the previous month. She won a silver Paralympic medal at Sochi, with a snowboard cross time of 2:07.31, and was named a knight of the National Order of Merit by then-president François Hollande in June 2014.

In the 2014–15 season, Hernandez-Cervellon won the grand slam with all stages of the World Para Snowboard World Cup in both snowboard cross and banked slalom; leading her first full season gained her a Crystal  Globe and she ended the season at La Molina crowned world champion in banked slalom and with a silver medal in snowboard cross.

On 4 February 2017 at Big White, she won another silver medal in snowboard cross, winning the banked slalom silver 3 days later. At the end of the 2016–17 season the following month, with 7 spots on the podium, including 5 victories, she won a third  and both  for snowboard cross and banked slalom.

She joined the  team on 20 January 2017 with the aim of travelling to PyeongChang as a part of the French Paralympic team for the 2018 Winter games, where she won bronze in the snowboard cross and silver in the banked slalom.

She won the silver medal in the women's dual banked slalom SB-LL1 event at the 2021 World Para Snow Sports Championships held in Lillehammer, Norway. She also won the gold medal in the women's snowboard cross SB-LL1 event.

Hernandez is classified as a SB-LL1 snowboarder. Hernandez learned days before her competition at the 2022 Winter Paralympics that she was allowed to compete. This was previously not permitted as there are no SB-LL1 events for female snowboarders in the snowboarding programme. She won the gold medal in the women's snowboard cross SB-LL2 event. She also competed in the women's banked slalom SB-LL2 event.

Personal life 
Hernandez-Cervellon is married, to Frédéric, with a daughter, Victoire-Eléonore.

Works 
  [War of Nerves], Monaco: Rocher, 2008. , 
  [What's she doing mummy?], Monaco: Rocher, 2009. ,

References

External links 
 
 
 Cécile Hernandez at World Para Snowboard
 
 

1974 births
Living people
French disabled sportspeople
French female snowboarders
Paralympic snowboarders of France
Paralympic medalists in snowboarding
Paralympic gold medalists for France
Paralympic silver medalists for France
Paralympic bronze medalists for France
Snowboarders at the 2014 Winter Paralympics
Snowboarders at the 2018 Winter Paralympics
Snowboarders at the 2022 Winter Paralympics
Medalists at the 2014 Winter Paralympics
Medalists at the 2018 Winter Paralympics
Medalists at the 2022 Winter Paralympics
Knights of the Ordre national du Mérite
Le Figaro people
21st-century French women